Traditional games of Korea have been influenced by the culture, history and environment of the Korean Peninsula. Koreans have enjoyed games throughout history with family and friends, and the games have created a sense of community. The most popular traditional games are Jegichagi, Neolttwigi, Ssireum, Tuho, Hitting Tombstone and Yutnori.

Characteristics

Korean traditional games originated from folk beliefs. The peninsula has been agrarian since ancient times, and Koreans have believed in gods who protect nature and their lands. Exorcisms were performed to increase crops and animal well-being; singing and dancing were popular activities. Traditional games developed during this early period. Although many folk beliefs have disappeared, the games continue to be played.

The names and rules of the games differ by region. In Gyeonggi-do, Gonu is called "Gonu, Goni, Ggoni". Under Japanese rule, nearly all traditional games in Korea disappeared.

Most games (such as Tuho, Ssireum and kite flying) are played with the hands or feet (Jegichagi, Taekgyeon) and do not require equipment or a specific play area. The games are related to the four seasons.

Games

Yutnori
Yutnori, a board dice game with four wooden sticks, is one of the most popular traditional games of Korea and usually played on the first day of the New Year by two players (or teams). Each player (or team of two players) takes turns throwing yut sticks. Each stick has two sides (round and flat), which makes the stick roll. Five combinations are possible with yut sticks: do, gae, geol, yut and mo. A player achieving a yut or mo is allowed to roll again. If a board piece lands on a space occupied by an opponent, it is returned to the start and the player goes again. If a piece lands on a space occupied by one's own team, the pieces can go together (counting as one). The combinations determine how the board pieces are moved, and the team that moves all four pieces around the board first wins. The game has its roots in divination rituals.

Ssireum (wrestling)
Ssireum is similar to Japanese sumo wrestling, with two opponents wrestling each other in a sandy ring. The player who throws his opponent to the ground scores a point. Annual competitions are held, which are popular. Ssireum, a contest of strength and technique, is a form of wrestling unique to Korea.

Traditionally practiced as combat and self-defense, ssireum was also part of rituals conducted in the ancient tribal states. Rules evolved, allowing ssireum to develop into a national sport valued for competition and entertainment.

Top-spinning

In top-spinning, played primarily by children, a player spins a wooden top with a stick to make it spin on ice or on the ground. Popular in winter, the games have names which vary by region. The best tops (made from birch, jujube or pine) are heavy, with strong tips, and they are often spun in groups.

Kite flying

Kite frames are generally made of bamboo, with paper attached. Most kites, rectangular or stingray-shaped, are tethered with string on a reel. Kite flying is a traditional winter game for children and adults. There is a period of kite flying from New Year's Day to Daeboreum, after which the kite string is cut for it to fly away. Kite flying is less common today, due to work obligations, but kites were flown as a distraction from the cold winter.

Tuho was originally popular among royal families and the upper class. In a manner similar to horseshoes, tuho players attempt to throw arrows into the top of a narrow-necked wooden jar. The score is determined by the number of arrows in the jar. Tuho is presently played by people from all classes.

According to Rebecca Lucas, tuho was played on the Korean Peninsula during the Gorguryeo Kingdom (37 BCE–668 CE) and is mentioned in the History of Old Tang (舊唐書) and the Book of Sui (隋書). The game waned in popularity because King Yejong of Goryeo (c. 1105–1122) received a tuho set from the Song emperor in 1116 and did not know how it was played. During the Joseon dynasty, it was promoted as Confucian. The game was played by both women and men, including Prince Yangnyong (양녕대군, 讓寧大君, 1394–1462) and his sisters, and King Hyeonjong of Joseon (현종, 顯宗. 1641–1674) and his family.

Gonu
A variety of Pong Hau K'i, Gonu's name (goni, ggoni, ggon or gonni) and rules vary by region; examples are pond, line or pumpkin gonu. This game is played with a small pebble (or piece of wood) and a game board drawn on the ground or a piece of paper. Players move their pebbles one block forward, and the player who blocks their opponent's pebble wins.

Neolttwigi

Neolttwigi is a Korean seesaw. Unlike Western seesaws, where riders sit at each end, neolttwigi participants stand and jump (launching their partner into the air on the opposite side). The game is popular among girls during traditional holidays and festivals such as Dano and Chuseok.

Jegichagi

In jegichagi, players kick a jegi and the player with the greatest number of kicks wins, similar to Western Hacky Sack. Usually played in winter, jegichagi's name varies by region. The jegi, similar in appearance to a shuttlecock, is made from a coin and hanji (handmade Korean paper). The player kicks the jegi into the air and continues kicking it to keep it off the ground; switching the kicking foot is permitted. In a one-on-one game, the player with the highest number of consecutive kicks wins; in a group game, players stand in a circle and take turns kicking the jegi. A player who lets the jegi fall to the ground loses and tosses it to the winner to kick. When the loser catches the jegi with their hands, they can rejoin the game.

Gonggi

Gonggi (Hangul:공기, pronounced gong-gee) is a popular Korean children's game that is traditionally played using five or more small grape-sized pebbles or coloured plastic stones. It can be played alone or with friends. Since only a few stones and a flat surface are needed for play, the game can be played by anyone almost anywhere. The same game also exists in Nepal and it is called Gatti. It is similar to Knucklebones in Western tradition. There are many ways to play Gonggi, but the most typical way to play Gonggi is playing with five marbles or pebbles. Also, Gonggi was played in many other places.

Hitting Tombstone
Hitting Tombstone (Hangul:비석치기) is a traditional Korean game that uses tombstones, which are small square pillar stones. The aim is to knock down the other tombstones. The game used to be played in spring and autumn. There are many different rules and names in different regions.

Origin
The game originated from the stones that people threw to protect themselves from savages.

How to play
The game is played by two players; the order is decided first. Two lines are drawn on the floor and players stand at regular intervals. The player has to use their tombstone to knock down the other player's tombstone; if they succeed, they have to put their tombstone on top of their foot. The tombstone then needs to be carried to the other player's tombstone without it falling from the foot. Once this is achieved, the previous stages are repeated, but the tombstone is put at a higher part of the body. If the tombstone falls or the player cannot knock down the other tombstone, the turn is handed over. Whoever completes all the stages is the winner.

Meaning
The game improves balance and flexibility; it is also amusing since the players make peculiar poses.

Juldarigi

Juldarigi (Hangul: 줄다리기, also chuldarigi) is a traditional Korean sport similar to tug of war. It uses two huge rice-straw ropes, connected by a central peg. The ropes are pulled by teams that represent the East and West sides of the village (the competition is often rigged in favour of the Western team). A number of religious and traditional rituals are performed before and after the actual competition.

Rolling hoop
Rolling hoop is a Korean traditional game that uses an iron stick. In the past, people used an old wagon wheel instead of an iron hoop. In the opening ceremony of the 1988 Olympics in Seoul, there was a performance that featured rolling hoop.

Jwibulnori

Definition

Jwibulnori is a Korean traditional game played on January 15 of the lunar calendar. This day is said to have the largest moon of the year. Many events are done on this day and Jwibulnori is one of them. Cans are filled with flammable items, then people light them on fire. Using a wire connected to the can, it is spun over a person's head. This makes a beautiful image.

Origin

The exact origin of this game is unknown. However, it is known that people have used cans since the Korean War. During the war, many military supplies including cans were imported. The cans were played with and it was combined with Jwibulnori.

How to play

In the past, people used mugworts. Nowadays, people use cans with many holes that are filled with wood pieces and pine cones. The holes help the can to burn longer since air goes through it. As time passed, the original Jwibulnori and other games were made. The games were slightly changed to make them more enjoyable. One example of the game is people getting into groups and competing. Farmers or young people get into groups and run with torches, burning large areas or turning off the torch from the other side.

Meaning

While people do Jwibulnori, other people piled some straw and sticks and burnt the pile. Using this as a sign, people lit fire on fields. The event is done to wish a year of prosperity and prevent harmful insects from damaging the crops; the fire kills harmful insects. It kills mice, which can carry infectious diseases. The soil of burnt weeds becomes manure for the crops, which make the soil richer and the crops grow better. Spinning the can symbolizes evil and bad luck.

Seasonal games

Other traditional Korean games

Bossaum (보싸움)

Origin 
Bossaum in English is called ‘dam wrecking’.  Children created ‘dam wrecking’ through observation of adults and created their own dams. Through the creation of these small dams, they invented the game, bossaum.

Objective of the game 
A game where players compete to destroy opposing team's dams.

How to play the game 
Players are divided into two teams and then proceed to decide where teams will set their dams: upstream or downstream. The players will then start building their dams with anything around them (ex. stones, dirt, grass, sticks, etc.) in order to build a dam.  To get the correct thickness and create a durable dam, players must take into consideration the conditions of the water stream such as the flow and volume of the water. Once the dam is completed, the game is ready to begin. The upstream team will ask the downstream team if they are ready once as a certain amount of water is collected. If they are ready, the upstream team will start to deconstruct their dam as much to the extent that the stored water will flow out and damage the downstream team's dam. As this is happening, to prevent collapsing, the downstream team will reinforce their own dam. If they don't succeed, the upstream team wins, but if they protect it from collapsing, the downstream team wins the game. When the round ends, the teams switch locations.

Garakji chatginori (가락지찾기놀이)

Objective of the game 
Players trying to find hidden garakji (hidden object).

Origin 
The game is also called Garakji Gamchigi Nori. Garakji is a pair of big rings that married women wore. They are usually made out of metal such as silver or stones like jade. Although rings were typically used to play the game, other objects were used as well which then would change the name of the game. This game was usually played indoors during the winter time and is typically played by young and/or grown women.

How to play the game 
The game is often played with about ten people. The group will sit in a circle and someone among the group is chosen to be the finder (sometimes called tiger or cat). The finder has to sit in the middle and covers their eyes. The garakji will be passed around under their skirts or knees as the people in the circle sing a song. The group must try not to show the garakji to the finder and be careful not to drop it. When the finder says stop or the song ends, they will start looking the garakji. In order to confuse the finder, the players sitting in the circle may try to trick the finder through their actions or words. The finder will point to a person who they think has the garakji or object. If the assumption is wrong, they must stay in the middle and go for another round. However, if the person with the garakji/object is caught, they are now the finder.

Gamnae Gejuldangigi (감내게줄당기기)

Objective of the game 
Two teams must work together to pull the rope using their core strength to move the rope further into their side from the center line.

Origin 
This variation of tug-of-war is a traditional game played by community members in the Gamcheon-ri (Gamnae) of Bubuk-myeon, Miryang, Gyeongsangnam-do Province area. Gamcheon was a popular stream where local residents would fight over good spots for catching crab. In this community, the elders would suggest a game of tug of war to resolve fights. The rope is not like the ropes used in a typical game of tug of war, but was a rope that was knotted in the middle in the shape of a crab. During these competitions, songs and instruments would be played to excite the audience and create tension between the competitors. In the 1920s when crab production increased, the traditional game was ceased and made its return during special holidays.

How to play the game 
The game is a simple tug-of-war competition but with a bit of a twist: players, instead of standing as they pull onto the rope facing each other, they are crawling away, facing opposite directions as they hitch the rope on their shoulders and use their core to pull. There are 2 teams typically from differing communities and players are placed in a specific positions. A gong is played and the players start to plow into the ground like cows, trying to tug as far off as they can. The game time is often a count to 100 (3 minutes). The team that is capable of tugging the rope further over their side from the centerline is declared the winner. If the round ends in a tie, two more games will be held until there is a winner.

References

External links 
 Culturecontent (문화콘텐츠닷컴) 
 National Folk Museum(국립민속박물관) 
 No-ri research society(놀이지도) 
 National Folk Museum(국립민속박물관) 
 National center museum (국립중앙박물관) 
 Gwangju Folk Museum (광주시립민속박물관) 
 Traditional Culture Museum (전통문화콘텐츠박물관) 
 Andong Folk Museum (안동시립민속박물관)

 
Traditional games
Articles containing video clips